Camptoloma quimeiae is a moth of the subfamily Arctiinae. It is endemic to Taiwan.

External links
 , 2010: Camptoloma quimeiae sp. n., a new Camptolominae species from Taiwan (Lepidoptera: Noctuidae). Entomofauna 0031: 49-56.

Arctiinae